Gibbons's emo skink, Fiji barred treeskink, or Viti barred treeskink (Emoia trossula) is a species of lizard in the family Scincidae. It is found in Fiji, the Cook Islands and Tonga.

References

Emoia
Reptiles described in 1986
Taxa named by Walter Creighton Brown
Taxa named by John Richard Hutchinson Gibbons